Halls Mills Bridge is a wooden covered bridge over the Neversink River. It is in the town of Neversink, in Sullivan County, New York, on Hunter Road. Construction began in 1906 and was completed in 1912, built by David Benton and James Knight.  It is a single span of town lattice truss design. The bridge was retired from vehicle use in 1963, but is still accessible to pedestrians only.

One of the dry stacked stone abutments was damaged heavily during Hurricanes Irene and Lee in August 2011. FEMA, Local and County resources are currently working to restore it to pre-storm condition.

It is one of 22 covered bridges in New York State.

References

External links
 www.hallsmillscoveredbridge.com 
 Halls Mills Bridge, at New York State Covered Bridge Society
 Halls Mills Bridge, at Covered Bridges of the Northeast USA
 at Halls Mills Covered Bridge Home

Covered bridges in New York (state)
Bridges completed in 1912
Bridges in Sullivan County, New York
Tourist attractions in Sullivan County, New York
Road bridges in New York (state)
1912 establishments in New York (state)
Wooden bridges in New York (state)
Lattice truss bridges in the United States